The results of the 2017, 8th Tarang Cine Awards, was presented annually by the Tarang entertainment television channel to honor artistic and technical excellence in the Oriya language film industry of India ("Ollywood"), are as follow:

 8th Tarang Cine Award, 2017
 Tarang Cine Awards 2017

References

2017 Indian film awards
Tarang Cine Awards